Nimvar (also Romanized as Nīmvar and Nīmwar; also known as Nimehvan and Nīmeh Var) is a city in the Central District of Mahallat County, Markazi Province, Iran.  At the 2006 census, its population was 5,731, in 1,580 families.

In ancient times Nimvar was an important location for Zoroastrianism. Nimvar is one of the ancient cities related to Sasanid and Ashkanian eras in Iran its historical customs are still alive and one of them with the antiquity of two thousand years is the dredging ceremony of Qom rood and BilGardani ceremony that is the sign of nature being harnessed by human.

References

Populated places in Mahallat County

Cities in Markazi Province